Giani Hira Singh Dard  (12 February 1887 – 22 June 1965) was a Punjabi journalist and writer. He had begun to write religious and patriotic poetry in his early youth under the pseudonym of "Dard". He was among the founders of Kendri Punjabi Likhari Sabha (Central Punjabi Writers Association). Hira Singh Dard was a revolutionary and his writings depict his revolt against the social evils.

Life and work 
Giani Hira Singh Dard was born at village Ghaghrot (district Rawalpindi). His father's name was Bhai Hari Singh.

He also took part in the Gurdwara Reform Movement and was the assistant editor of the Akālī, Akhbar.

After the partition of the Punjab in 1947, he settled in Jalandhar (Punjab, India)

Works

Poetry-Collections 
 ਦਰਦ ਸੁਨੇਹੇ (In three parts)
 ਹੋਰ ਅਗੇਰੇ
 ਚੋਣਵੇਂ ਦਰਦ ਸੁਨੇਹੇ

Story-Collections 
 ਪੰਜਾਬੀ ਸੱਧਰਾਂ
 ਕਿਸਾਨ ਦੀਆਂ ਆਹੀਂ
 ਆਸ ਦੀ ਤੰਦ

References 

1880s births
1965 deaths
People from Rawalpindi District
Journalists from Punjab, India
Indian male poets
Indian male short story writers